Emil Stoev (born 17 January 1996) is a Bulgarian footballer who plays  as an attacking midfielder for Slavia Sofia.

Career
Stoev began his career from Slavia. On 16 February 2017 he was sent on loan to Botev Vratsa until the end of the season. The loan was further extended in July. On 8 January 2018 Stoev returned in Slavia after his loan ended in the end of 2017.

Career statistics

Club

References

External links

1996 births
Living people
Footballers from Sofia
Bulgarian footballers
Bulgaria youth international footballers
Association football midfielders
PFC Slavia Sofia players
FC Botev Vratsa players
First Professional Football League (Bulgaria) players
Second Professional Football League (Bulgaria) players